Shiroh is a rock musical by Hidenori Inoue and Kazuki Nakashima.

Cast
Shiroh - Akinori Nakagawa
Matsuda Shiroh Tokisada - Takaya Kamikawa
Yamada Juan - Yumiko Takahashi
O-Fuku - Kyoko
Rio - Chihiro Otsuka
O-Kou - Shoko Takada
Yagyū Jūbei Mitsuyoshi - Jun Takada
Masuda Jinbe - Jun Uemoto
Miyake Kurodo - Makoto Kurine
Itakura Shigemasa - Keigo Yoshino
Zenza - Yohei Izumi
Tsuyazakimondo - Narushi Ikeda
O-Mitsu - Natsuko Akiyama
Matsudaira Nobutsuna - Toru Emori

Characters

DVD

Shiroh (DVD) was released on October 5, 2005.
 Shiroh (2005) 195min + 50min

References

External links
Official site

Rock musicals
Japanese direct-to-video films
2004 musicals
2000s musical films
2000s Japanese films